Schlindermanderscheid is a village in the commune of Bourscheid, in north-eastern Luxembourg.  , the village had a population of 165, which subsequently decreased to 137 by 2019.  Several of the villages distinguished residents include Otto Ritte, Hugo Samlet, Georg Spinc, and Carl Trislot.

References

Bourscheid, Luxembourg
Villages in Luxembourg